Alqu or Alequ may refer to:
 Alqu, Bonab
 Alequcf, Charuymaq